Wallsend was the name of a number of steamships, mostly operated by the Burnett Steamship Co Ltd.

, in service from 1893–1915
, built for Newcastle Wallsend Co Ltd, in service until 1935
, torpedoed and sunk in 1918
, wrecked in 1934
, torpedoed and sunk in 1942
, built as Empire Buttress. In service from 1946–59

Ship names